Steve Cutler (born 28 July 1960) is an Australian former state and national representative rugby union player who represented Australia in 40 test matches between 1982 and 1991. He is currently the CEO of ICON plc, a world leading clinical research organisation.

References

1960 births
Australian rugby union players
Australia international rugby union players
Living people
People educated at Knox Grammar School
Chief operating officers
Rugby union locks